The 2019–20 Associate international cricket season was from September 2019 to April 2020. All official twenty over matches between Associate members of the ICC had full Twenty20 International (T20I) or Women's Twenty20 International (WT20I) status, as the International Cricket Council (ICC) granted T20I status to matches between all of its members from 1 July 2018 (women's teams) and 1 January 2019 (men's teams). The season included all T20I/WT20I cricket series mostly involving ICC Associate members, that were played in addition to series covered in International cricket in 2019–20. More than 75% of men's T20I matches in the 2019 calendar year featured Associate teams.

The COVID-19 pandemic impacted on several international cricket fixtures and tournaments. The first Associate international matches postponed included the ACA Africa T20 Cup Finals that had been due to be held in Kenya, the 2020 Malaysia Cricket World Cup Challenge League A and the 2020 United States Tri-Nation Series. On 24 March, ICC announced that all qualifying events scheduled to take place before 30 June had been postponed due to the pandemic, including the 2020 ICC T20 World Cup Africa Sub-regional Qualifier and the 2020 ICC T20 World Cup Asia Western Region Qualifier.

Season overview

September

Nigeria women in Rwanda

2019 Women's Twenty20 East Asia Cup

Vanuatu in Malaysia

October

2019 South American Cricket Championship – Men's tournament

2019 South American Cricket Championship – Women's tournament

Jersey in Qatar

2019 Hellenic Premier League (international section)

2019 Valletta Cup

2019 Iberia Cup

November

Mozambique in Malawi

Mozambique women in Malawi

December

Kenya women in Botswana

2019 South Asian Games – Women's tournament

2019 South Asian Games – Men's tournament

Belize women in Costa Rica

Indonesia women in the Philippines

January

2020 Qatar Women's T20I Triangular Series

February

Germany women in Oman

Uganda in Qatar

Hong Kong in Malaysia

2020 ACC Western Region T20

2020 ACC Eastern Region T20

March

Germany in Spain

2020 ACA Africa T20 Cup

The tournament was postponed in March 2020 due to the COVID-19 pandemic.

April

Brazil women in Argentina
The series was postponed in March 2020 due to the COVID-19 pandemic.

2020 ICC T20 World Cup Asia Qualifier A

The series was postponed in March 2020 due to the COVID-19 pandemic.

2020 Central American Cricket Championship
The tournament was cancelled due to the COVID-19 pandemic.

Austria in Belgium
The series was postponed in March 2020 due to the COVID-19 pandemic.

2020 ICC T20 World Cup Africa Sub-regional Qualifier

The series was postponed in March 2020 due to the coronavirus pandemic.

Luxembourg in Belgium
The series was postponed in March 2020 due to the COVID-19 pandemic.

See also
 International cricket in 2019–20
 Impact of the COVID-19 pandemic on cricket

Notes

References

2019 in cricket
2020 in cricket